In mathematics, the direct method in the calculus of variations is a general method for constructing a proof of the existence of a minimizer for a given functional, introduced by Stanisław Zaremba and David Hilbert around 1900. The method relies on methods of functional analysis and topology. As well as being used to prove the existence of a solution, direct methods may be used to compute the solution to desired accuracy.

The method 
The main interest of the subject is to find minimizers for such functionals, that is, functions  such that:

The standard tool for obtaining necessary conditions for a function to be a minimizer is the Euler–Lagrange equation. But seeking a minimizer amongst functions satisfying these may lead to false conclusions if the existence of a minimizer is not established beforehand.

The functional  must be bounded from below to have a minimizer. This means

This condition is not enough to know that a minimizer exists, but it shows the existence of a minimizing sequence, that is, a sequence  in  such that 

The direct method may be broken into the following steps
 Show that  is sequentially lower semi-continuous with respect to the topology .

To see that this shows the existence of a minimizer, consider the following characterization of sequentially lower-semicontinuous functions.
The function  is sequentially lower-semicontinuous if

The conclusions follows from
,
in other words
.

Details

Banach spaces 
The direct method may often be applied with success when the space  is a subset of a separable reflexive Banach space .
  is bounded from below,
  is weakly sequentially lower semi-continuous, i.e., for any weakly convergent sequence  it holds that .
The second part is usually accomplished by showing that  admits some growth condition. An example is
A functional with this property is sometimes called coercive. Showing sequential lower semi-continuity is usually the most difficult part when applying the direct method. See below for some theorems for a general class of functionals.

Sobolev spaces 
The typical functional in the calculus of variations is an integral of the form

When deriving the Euler–Lagrange equation, the common approach is to assume  has a  boundary and let the domain of definition for  be . This space is a Banach space when endowed with the supremum norm, but it is not reflexive.

This restriction allows finding minimizers of the functional  that satisfy some desired boundary conditions. This is similar to solving the Euler–Lagrange equation with Dirichlet boundary conditions.
The idea of solving minimization problems while restricting the values on the boundary can be further generalized by looking on function spaces where the trace is fixed only on a part of the boundary, and can be arbitrary on the rest.

The next section presents theorems regarding weak sequential lower semi-continuity of functionals of the above type.

Sequential lower semi-continuity of integrals 
As many functionals in the calculus of variations are of the form
,

In general one has the following:
Assume that  is a function that has the following properties:
 The function  is a Carathéodory function.
 There exist  with Hölder conjugate  and  such that the following inequality holds true for almost every  and every : .
If the function  is convex for almost every  and every ,
then  is sequentially weakly lower semi-continuous.

When  or  the following converse-like theorem holds
Assume that  is continuous and satisfies

If  is sequentially weakly lower semi-continuous, then for any given  the function  is convex.

However, there are many interesting cases where one cannot assume that  is convex. The following theorem proves sequential lower semi-continuity using a weaker notion of convexity:
Assume that  is a function that has the following properties:
 The function  is a Carathéodory function.
 The function  has -growth for some : There exists a constant  such that for every  and for almost every  .
 For every  and for almost every , the function  is quasiconvex: there exists a cube  such that for every  it holds:

A converse like theorem in this case is the following:

Assume that  is continuous and satisfies

If  is sequentially weakly lower semi-continuous, then for any given  the function  is quasiconvex.

Notes

References and further reading 
 
 
 Morrey, C. B., Jr.: Multiple Integrals in the Calculus of Variations. Springer, 1966 (reprinted 2008), Berlin .
 Jindřich Nečas: Direct Methods in the Theory of Elliptic Equations. (Transl. from French original 1967 by A.Kufner and G.Tronel), Springer, 2012, .

 Acerbi Emilio, Fusco Nicola. "Semicontinuity problems in the calculus of variations." Archive for Rational Mechanics and Analysis 86.2 (1984): 125-145

Calculus of variations